Sosnovka is a rural locality (a village) in Atarshinsky Selsoviet, Belokataysky District, Bashkortostan, Russia. The population was 25 as of 2010. There are 2 streets.

Geography 
Sosnovka is located 21 km south of Novobelokatay (the district's administrative centre) by road. Atarsha is the nearest rural locality.

References 

Rural localities in Belokataysky District